Chamaebryum is a genus of moss in the family Gigaspermaceae; it contains the single species Chamaebryum pottioides.  This species is endemic to southern Africa.

References

Monotypic moss genera
Gigaspermales